Karlo Kamenar (born 15 March 1994 Zagreb) is a Croatian professional footballer who plays as a midfielder for Bosnian Premier League club Zrinjski Mostar.

Club career
Having passed through the ranks of the GNK Dinamo Zagreb youth academy, playing with the likes of Mateo Kovačić, Kamenar was moved to NK Lokomotiva's U19 side, where he completed his youth career without being subsequently given a senior contract with the club. He moved to third-tier NK Stupnik before moving on to second-tier NK Rudeš where, in his fourth season with the club, he achieved promotion to the Prva HNL, the first in the club's history.

In July 2017, Kamenar made NK Rudeš club history by being the first player to score a top-tier goal for the club.

Following a successful season at the club and good performances against higher-ranked teams, having scored 5 goals in 32 league matches, Kamenar was snapped up by NK Osijek in June 2018.

In August 2020 he became a member of lithuanian FK Žalgiris.

International career
Kamenar played in two friendly matches for the Croatia U17 in August 2010.

Honours
Rudeš
2. HNL: 2016–17

Žalgiris
A Lyga: 2020

Zrinjski Mostar
Bosnian Premier League: 2021–22

References

External links

1994 births
Living people
Footballers from Zagreb
Association football midfielders
Croatian footballers
Croatia youth international footballers
NK Rudeš players
NK Osijek players
FK Žalgiris players
Mezőkövesdi SE footballers
HŠK Zrinjski Mostar players
First Football League (Croatia) players
Croatian Football League players
A Lyga players
Nemzeti Bajnokság I players
Premier League of Bosnia and Herzegovina players
Croatian expatriate footballers
Expatriate footballers in Lithuania
Croatian expatriate sportspeople in Lithuania
Expatriate footballers in Hungary
Croatian expatriate sportspeople in Hungary
Expatriate footballers in Bosnia and Herzegovina
Croatian expatriate sportspeople in Bosnia and Herzegovina